D'Urville or d'Urville is a French family name, notably that of explorer Jules Dumont d'Urville (1790 – 1842) who gave his name to many places and objects, especially in Antarctica and New Zealand.  It may also refer to:

People
 D'Urville Martin (1939 – 1984), American actor and director in film and television

Places
Antarctica
 D'Urville Island, Antarctica
 D'Urville Monument
 D'Urville Sea
 D'Urville Wall
 Dumont d'Urville Station
 Mount D'Urville, Antarctica

New Zealand
 D'Urville River
 D'Urville Island, New Zealand
 Mount D'Urville

Other
 French aviso Dumont d'Urville, class of French naval ships

See also
 Durvillaea, genus of brown algae known as bull kelp
 Durville (disambiguation)